Sharaf al-Muluk (Persian: شرف الملوک) was the ruler of the Bavand dynasty from 1328 to 1334. He was the son and successor of Shah-Kaykhusraw. Little is known about Sharaf; he died in 1334, and was succeeded by his brother Hasan II of Tabaristan.

Sources
 
 

14th-century Bavandid rulers
1334 deaths
Year of birth unknown